The Cathedral Church of St John the Baptist is the Roman Catholic cathedral of the city of Norwich, Norfolk, England.

History

The cathedral, located on Unthank Road, was constructed between 1882 and 1910 to designs by George Gilbert Scott, Jr. as a parish church dedicated to John the Baptist, on the site of the Norwich City Gaol. The funds for its construction were provided by Henry Fitzalan-Howard, 15th Duke of Norfolk, as a gesture of thanksgiving for his first marriage to Lady Flora Abney-Hastings.

In 1976, it was consecrated as the cathedral church for the newly erected Diocese of East Anglia and the seat of the Bishop of East Anglia. In 2014, for the first time since 1558, a Pontifical High Mass was celebrated in this episcopal see's cathedral.

It is one of two cathedrals in the city of Norwich, the other being the Church of England Cathedral Church of the Holy and Undivided Trinity, begun in the Norman style in 1096.

Resources

Just off the south aisle of the cathedral is the Duckett Library. It was named after Canon Richard Duckett who was rector of the church from 1876 to 1910. It was opened on 22 February 2012. People need to become a member of the library to join, and that membership is available to all the cathedral's congregation. It has 3,000 religious publications and is staffed by volunteers.

Also, within the cathedral ground is the Narthex. It opened in March 2010 and is the cathedral's visitor centre. It comprises an Education and Interpretation Gallery, a shop, a refectory with outdoor patio, a function hall, licensed bar and community garden.

Parish
The cathedral's parish also covers Holy Apostles Church, West Earlham, in a suburb of Norwich.

Interior

References

External links
St John the Baptist Cathedral homepage
History, description and images (Simon Knott, norfolkchurches.co.uk, accessed 29 October 2012)
Image of the cathedral (accessed 24 September 2007)
Floor plan of the cathedral (accessed 23 August 2017)
Narthex opens March, 2010
Roman Catholic Cathedral of St John the Baptist, Norwich (British Listed Buildings)
Interior view at Google Maps

Churches in Norwich
Roman Catholic cathedrals in England
Roman Catholic churches in Norfolk
Roman Catholic Diocese of East Anglia
Grade I listed cathedrals
Grade I listed churches in Norfolk
Roman Catholic churches completed in 1910
20th-century Roman Catholic church buildings in the United Kingdom